The XVIII Memorial of Hubert Jerzy Wagner was a volleyball tournament held at Tauron Arena in Kraków, Poland. Like the previous editions, 4 teams participated in the tournament.

Initially, the tournament was scheduled to be played in 2020, but due to COVID-19 pandemic it was postponed to 2021.

Qualification
All teams except the host must have received an invitation from the organizers.

Venue

Results
All times are local Central European Summer Time (UTC+2).

Ranking

|}

|}

Final standing

Awards

Most Valuable Player
  Wilfredo León
Best Setter
  Fabian Drzyzga
Best Server
  Mateusz Bieniek
Best Receiver
  Mohamed Issa

Best Blocker
  Piotr Nowakowski
Best Spiker
  Bartosz Kurek
Best Libero
  Paweł Zatorski

References

External links
Official website (Polish)

Memorial of Hubert Jerzy Wagner
Sports competitions in Kraków
Memorial of Hubert Jerzy Wagner
Memorial of Hubert Jerzy Wagner
Memorial of Hubert Jerzy Wagner
21st century in Kraków
International volleyball competitions hosted by Poland